Leah McCall Devlin (born August 10, 1954) is a professor in the Department of Health Policy and Management at the UNC Gillings School of Global Public Health.  

The daughter of Fred and Pearle McCall, Devlin was born in Harnett County, North Carolina. She attended Buies Creek School, where she played basketball. 

A dentist by training, she was the Wake County Health Director for ten years and the State Health Director for North Carolina, also for ten years.

In 2019, she was named the Chair of the CDC Foundation's Board of Directors.

Devilin has been a consultant to the Aspen Institute, the Milbank Memorial Fund, and RTI International.

Devlin is married to Joseph Devlin. They have one son.

Education
MPH, Public Health, University of North Carolina at Chapel Hill, 1984
DDS, Dentistry, University of North Carolina at Chapel Hill, 1979
BS, Dentistry, University of North Carolina at Chapel Hill, 1976

References

1954 births
Living people
American dentists
UNC Gillings School of Global Public Health alumni
University of North Carolina at Chapel Hill faculty
Women dentists
People from North Carolina